Thomasina Jean "Tommi" Miers, OBE (born February 1976) is an English cook, writer and television presenter. She is the co-founder of the Wahaca chain of Mexican street food restaurants.

Early life
Thomasina Jean "Tommi" Miers was born in February 1976 in Cheltenham, the daughter of (Michael) Probyn Miers, a joiner and furniture maker, formerly a management consultant and Niki Miers, of Guiting Power, Cheltenham. She grew up in "a big rambling house" at Acton, West London. The Miers family, landed gentry originally of Aldingham, Cumbria (then in Lancashire), owned the Ynyspenllwch estate in Glamorganshire until the time of her grandfather, Cmdr Richard Eustace Probyn Miers, RN. Miers has a twin brother, Dighton, and a sister, Talulah.

She studied at St Paul's Girls' School, Edinburgh University (Modern Languages) and Ballymaloe Cookery School and worked as a freelance cook and writer, with influences from time spent in Mexico.

Career
In 2005, Miers won the BBC TV cookery competition MasterChef, "impressing judges John Torode and Gregg Wallace with her bold and, at times, eccentric cooking style".

She has made two series of cookery programmes for Channel 4 with co-presenter Guy Grieve: Wild Gourmets in 2007 and A Cook's Tour of Spain in 2008. In 2011, she presented Mexican Food Made Simple for Channel 5.

She is co-editor with Annabel Buckingham of the cookbook Soup Kitchen (with an introduction by Hugh Fearnley-Whittingstall). She has also written Cook: Smart Seasonal Recipes for Hungry People, The Wild Gourmets: Adventures in Food and Freedom, with Guy Grieve, and Mexican Food Made Simple.

Miers co-founded Wahaca, which became a chain of Mexican "street food" restaurants, alongside Mark Selby in 2006. The company opened its first restaurant in London's Covent Garden in August 2007 and in October 2008 a second opened at Westfield London. Wahaca launched their first mobile kitchen in 2011, selling Mexican street food on the streets of London. By the end of 2017 Wahaca had 25 branches, and in January 2021 there were 13.

Personal life
Miers is married to Mark Williams, a fund manager at Liontrust Asset Management and they have three daughters.

In January 2019, Miers was made an Officer of the Order of the British Empire (OBE) for services to the food industry; she received the honour from the Duke of Cambridge later in the year at an investiture ceremony at Buckingham Palace.

Books
 The Wild Gourmets: Adventures in Food and Freedom (3 September 2007)  co-author Guy Grieve
 Wahaca – Mexican Food Made Simple (4 March 2010) 
 Wahaca – Mexican Food at Home (21 June 2012) 
 Chilli Notes (8 May 2014) 
 Cantina: Recipes from a Mexican Kitchen (1 November 2014) 
 Home Cook (2 March 2017) 
 Meat-Free Mexican (5 May 2022)

References

External links
 
 Miers' cookery articles in The Guardian

1976 births
British cookbook writers
English businesspeople
English food writers
English restaurateurs
Women restaurateurs
English television chefs
Living people
Officers of the Order of the British Empire
People educated at St Paul's Girls' School
People from Cheltenham
Women cookbook writers
Reality cooking competition winners
British gastronomes